Hiroim is a fictional character  appearing in American comic books published by Marvel Comics. The character is depicted usually as a supporting character in Hulk books.

Publication history
He first appeared in Incredible Hulk vol. 3 #92 and was created by Greg Pak and Carlo Pagulayan.

Fictional character biography
Originally, Hiroim was a Shadow Priest, dedicated to the story of the Sakaarson — he who would unite the people of Sakaar — and trained to join the other Shadows. However, for his blasphemy of daring to dream that he could be the Sakaarson, he was expelled from the order. He was then chosen to be the personal guard of the Emperor of Sakaar, and to uphold an alliance between the Shadows and the Empire. He broke this vow however, when the Emperor ordered Hiroim to kill his adolescent son, due to the belief that he would bring ruin and devastation to Sakaar (a prediction that ended up coming to pass). For breaking that oath, he ended up in the Empire's gladiator training school, the Maw, where he fought alongside such other warriors as Miek, No-Name the Brood, Korg and the Hulk. After two victories in the arena — during which their teammate Lavin Skee was badly injured —, having heard the stories of his allies, Hiroim formed a Warbound pact with them, vowing that they would always stand together. Having been freed from their obedience disks by the Silver Surfer, the Warbound went on to vanquish the Red King, Hiroim concluding that the Hulk was the true Sakaarson (although he briefly thought that the Surfer might be the Sakaarson).

With the destruction of Sakaar following the detonation of the shuttle that brought the Hulk to Earth, Hiroim absorbed the powers of all the Sakaar Shadow Priests as he was the only one left, and he accompanied the Hulk to Earth to wage war against the Illuminati. During the subsequent conflict with Earth's heroes, Hiroim defeated Luke Cage during the Warbound's initial attack, but was in turn defeated by Doctor Strange when the sorcerer called on the power of his old enemy Zom. Hiroim is missing his left arm  due to Doctor Strange's attack.

Following the revelation of Miek's treachery that Miek had allowed the destruction of Sakaar, the remaining Warbound surrender to S.H.I.E.L.D. custody. They manage to escape during tremors caused by Manhattan Island breaking up due to the damage the Hulk had caused. Channeling the rock-based powers of his fellow Warbound Korg, as well as Earth hero the Thing, Hiroim is able to 'heal' the damage before he and the others depart, escaping into the sewers.

During the World War Hulk Aftersmash: Warbound series, Hiroim and his fellow Warbound confront S.H.I.E.L.D. agents while attempt to protect a badly wounded Elloe Kaifi. Unfamiliar teleportational technology take all the Warbound and agent Kate Waynesboro to Nevada. Hiroim is not found with the others, as he had been separated by the Leader. Basing the two in a seemingly abandoned factory, the Leader uses Hiroim's powers to create a gamma-dome encapsulated environment called "Gamma World". Kate and the Warbound are trying to save him but the deadly shields go up despite their efforts. Hiroim eventually sacrifices himself to stop the Leader, and transfers his old power to Kate. Before his death, he was briefly able to rebuild his form, with an intact left arm, out of extant rock, channeling the full might of his Oldpowers.

During the Chaos War storyline, Hiroim ends up returning from the dead after what happened to the death realms. He ends up helping the Hulks in fighting Abomination and the forces of Zom and Amatsu-Mikaboshi. The issue also shows that Hiroim and Korg were in a homosexual relationship. While Hulk fights his father Brian Banner (who is in the form of Devil Hulk), Hiroim tries to exorcise Zom from Doctor Strange. This fails, but Zom is exorcised when Marlo Chandler taps into Death's powers.

Power and abilities
Like all the Shadow People, Hiroim at his base, natural state possesses physical traits slightly superior to the human maximum, and ages more slowly after reaching adulthood at the age of 13. He possessed the enormous strength of a trained Shadow Warrior and could lift up to one ton. Beyond this he has received quasi-mystic training as a Shadow Priest, and is an experienced warrior, strategist, and philosopher. After the deaths of Caiera and his people he inherited the stone-based "Oldstrong Power", drawing power from the planet itself, enabling him to turn his body into immensely hard and strong 'mystic rock'. Further demonstrated talents include sensing and unravelling powerful mystic wards cast by Doctor Strange, and limited control over the earth, as seen when helping to keep a massive chasm from destroying Manhattan Island.

Other versions

Marvel Zombies Return
In the fourth issue Hulk, along with the Warbound, reach the moon in hopes to start World War Hulk but instead meet zombiefied versions of Giant Man and the Immortals. In the battle Hiroim is eaten by one of the Immortals.

What If
Hiroim was featured in two "What If?" issues:

 In "What if The Hulk died and Caiera had lived?" Hiroim participates in the conquering of Earth with Caiera as queen.
 The first story of a "What If" that revolved around "World War Hulk" had Hiroim and the rest of Warbound are killed after Iron Man didn't hesitate in using the laser and destroys New York. The second story dealing with what would happen if Thor fought Hulk in the climax had Hiroim with the Warbound when they fought the Warriors Three. Following Thor's reasoning with the Hulk and the exposure of Miek's treachery Hulk, Hiroim and the rest of Warbound leave and create a new Sakaar.

In other media

Television
 Hiroim appears in the Hulk and the Agents of S.M.A.S.H. episode "Planet Leader", voiced by Fred Tatasciore. He is among the Sakaar inhabitants that are controlled by Leader where he oversaw the slaves in the Sakaar mines. Hiroim was later freed from the control disks when She-Hulk overloaded Leader's control on them.

Film
 Hiriom appears in the Planet Hulk film, voiced by Liam O'Brien.

See also
 Warbound
 Planet Hulk

References

External links
 Hiriom at Marvel.com

Fictional gladiators
Fictional priests and priestesses
Marvel Comics aliens
Marvel Comics extraterrestrial superheroes
Marvel Comics film characters
Marvel Comics LGBT superheroes
Marvel Comics male superheroes
Comics characters introduced in 2006
Characters created by Greg Pak